Infernäl Mäjesty is a Canadian heavy metal band, formed in 1986 and now based in Vancouver, British Columbia. They are best known for their debut album None Shall Defy, released in 1987.  However, the 1998 re-issue by Displeased Records inspired them to get back together and they recorded a new album, followed by a European tour. They are still active.

They are not to be confused with HIM, who were previously called 'His Infernal Majesty'.

Discography

Full-length 
 None Shall Defy (1987)
 Unholier Than Thou (1998)
 One who Points to Death (2004)
 No God (2017)

Other 
 Nigresent Dissolution (1988)
 Chaos in Copenhagen (live, 1999)
 Demon God EP (2007)

Line-up
Chris Bailey - vocals 
Kenny Hallman - guitars
Steve Terror - guitars
Eric Dubreuil - bass
Kiel Wilson - drums

Former members
Brian Langley - vocals
Bob Quelch - bass
Kevin Harrison - drums
Psycopath - bass
Chay McMullen - bass
Rick Nemes - drums
Kris DeBoer - drums
Greg Cavanagh - vocals
Don "Vince" Kuntz - vocals (died 2001)
Kiel Wilson - bass

References

External links

Infernal Majesty | listen and stream free music, albums, new releases, photos, videos
Infernäl Mäjesty - Encyclopaedia Metallum: The Metal Archives 
Facebook

Canadian heavy metal musical groups
Canadian thrash metal musical groups
Musical groups established in 1986
Musical groups from Toronto
Musical groups from Vancouver
1986 establishments in Ontario